Olaf Tandberg (7 July 1879 – 15 June 1932) was a Norwegian doctor and Nordic skier.

Career
On 11 February 1900 he set the ski jumping world record distance 35.5 metres (116 ft) at Solbergbakken hill in Bærum, Norway.

A year later he won the Nordic combined event at Holmenkollen and won the royal trophy. In later years he was a ski jumping judge in Holmenkollen between 1918 and 1930.

Ski jumping world record
Set on the first ever official ski jumping competition.

References

External links
Sondre Norheim – The Skiing Pioneer of Telemark

1879 births
1932 deaths
Holmenkollen medalists
Holmenkollen Ski Festival winners
Norwegian male ski jumpers
People from Askim
Sportspeople from Viken (county)